The Australia women's national cricket team toured New Zealand in January 1988. They played against New Zealand in three One Day Internationals, which were competed for the Rose Bowl. Australia won the series 3–0.

Squads

WODI Series

1st ODI

2nd ODI

3rd ODI

References

External links
Australia Women tour of New Zealand 1987/88 from Cricinfo

Women's international cricket tours of New Zealand
1988 in New Zealand cricket
Australia women's national cricket team tours